The Talking Animals is an album by T Bone Burnett, released in 1988.

The guest musicians include Peter Case, Bono, and Tonio K, among others.

Reception
Brett Hartenbach of AllMusic thought that "even with a few less than stellar songs, The Talking Animals is a strong, inspired record." Trouser Press called the album "all in all, worth hearing, though one wishes this talented jerk weren’t so impressed with himself." Robert Christgau wrote: "I hate to let the cat out of the bag, but this guy is pretentious."

Track listing
All songs by T Bone Burnett unless otherwise noted.

Side one
"The Wild Truth" – 3:38
"Monkey Dance" – 4:43
"Image" – 4:02
"Dance, Dance, Dance" – 2:45
"The Killer Moon" (Burnett, M. Burnett, Peter Case) – 5:00

Side two
"Relentless" – 3:24
"Euromad" – 4:21
"Purple Heart" (Bono, Burnett) – 4:36
"You Could Look It Up" – 2:41
"The Strange Case of Frank Cash and the Morning Paper" (Burnett, Tonio K) – 5:25

Personnel

Production notes
Produced by David Rhodes and T Bone Burnett
Recorded by Tchad Blake at Sunset Sound and Sunset Sound Factory with Mike Kloster
Mastered by Bob Ludwig

References

1987 albums
Columbia Records albums
T Bone Burnett albums
Albums produced by T Bone Burnett
Albums produced by David Rhodes (musician)